The 2009–10 BYU Cougars men's basketball team represented Brigham Young University in the 2009–10 college basketball season. This was head coach Dave Rose's fifth season at BYU. The Cougars were members of the Mountain West Conference and played their home games at the Marriott Center. They finished the season 30–6, 13–3 in MWC play. They advanced to the semifinals of the 2010 Mountain West Conference men's basketball tournament before losing to UNLV. They received an at–large bid to the 2010 NCAA Division I men's basketball tournament, earning a 7 seed in the West Region. They beat 10 seed Florida in double overtime in the first round before losing to 2 seed and AP #7 Kansas State in the second round.

Pre-season
In the Mountain West preseason polls, released October 6 at The Mtn. studios in Denver, Colorado, BYU was selected to finish first in the media poll. Jr. Jimmer Fredette was selected as the preseason conference player of the year along with being selected to the preseason MWC first team. Sr. Jonathan Tavernari was also selected to the preseason first team.

Roster
Source

Schedule and results

|-
!colspan=9 style=| Exhibition

|-
!colspan=9 style=| Regular Season

|-
!colspan=10 style=| Mountain West tournament

|-
!colspan=10 style=| NCAA tournament

Rankings

*AP does not release post-NCAA Tournament rankings^Coaches did not release a Week 2 poll.

References

BYU Cougars
BYU
BYU Cougars men's basketball seasons
BYU
BYU